The 2010 United States House of Representatives election in Wyoming was held on November 2, 2010, and determined who would represent the state of Wyoming in the United States House of Representatives. Representatives are elected for two-year terms; the elected served in the 112th Congress from January 4, 2011, until January 3, 2013. The election coincided with the 2010 midterm elections.

Wyoming has one seat in the House, apportioned according to the 2000 United States Census. Its 2008-2010 congressional House delegation consisted of one Republican.

Democratic primary

Candidates
David Wendt, Director of the Jackson Hole Center for Global Affairs

Results

Republican primary

Candidates
Cynthia Lummis, incumbent Congresswoman
Evan Liam Slafter

Results

General election

Candidates
Cynthia Lummis, incumbent Congresswoman (R)
David Wendt, Director of the Jackson Hole Center for Global Affairs (D)
John V. Love (L)

Polling

Results

See also 
 Wyoming's At-large congressional district

References

External links 
Elections at Wyoming Secretary of State
U.S. Congress Candidates for Wyoming at Project Vote Smart
Wyoming U.S. House - At-Large from OurCampaigns.com
Campaign contributions for U.S. Congressional races in Wyoming from OpenSecrets
2010 Wyoming General Election graph of multiple polls from Pollster.com

House - Wyoming from the Cook Political Report
Race ranking and details from CQ Politics
Race profile at The New York Times
Candidates: United States House of Representatives at Decision 2010 at Wyoming PBS

Wyoming
2010
2010 Wyoming elections